The Palais de la Découverte ("Discovery Palace") is a science museum located in the Grand Palais, in the 8th arrondissement on Avenue Franklin D. Roosevelt, Paris, France. It is open daily except Monday; an admission fee is charged.

The museum was created in 1937 by Jean Baptiste Perrin (awarded the Nobel Prize in Physics, 1926) during an international exhibition on "Arts and techniques in modern life". In 1938 the French government decided to convert the facility into a new museum, which now occupies 25,000 square metres within the west wing of the Grand Palais (Palais d'Antin) built for the Exposition Universelle (1900) to designs by architect Albert-Félix-Théophile Thomas.

In January 2010 the museum was merged with the Cité des Sciences et de l'Industrie under one institution is named universcience with two locations.

Today the museum contains permanent exhibits for mathematics, physics, astronomy, chemistry, geology, and biology, featuring interactive experiments with commentaries by lecturers. It includes a Zeiss planetarium with 15-metre dome.

Pi room
The museum contains a circular room known as the "pi room".  On its wall is inscribed 707 digits of the number .  The digits are large wooden characters attached to the dome-like ceiling.  The digits were based on an 1873 calculation by English mathematician William Shanks, which included an error in the 528th digit.  The error was detected in 1946 and corrected in 1949.

See also
 List of museums in Paris
 List of works by Alexandre Falguière

Footnotes

References

 Universcience
 Palais de la Découverte
 Grand Palais description
 Paris.org entry
 Le Palais de la découverte : un condensé de dysfonctionnements administratifs et politiques, Rapport d'information de M. Philippe ADNOT, fait au nom de la commission des finances, n° 354 (2006–2007) – 27 juin 2007
 Figaro, "Le Palais de la découverte à la dérive",  14 October 2007 (French)

External links
 Palais de la Découverte – official site

Museums in Paris
Science museums in France
Planetaria in France
Buildings and structures in the 8th arrondissement of Paris